Tétreau is a French surname. Notable people with the surname include: 

Édouard Tétreau (born 1970), French essayist, columnist, and political and economic consultant
Nérée Tétreau (1842–1911), Canadian notary, landowner and political figure

French-language surnames